

Martin Berg (4 April 1905 – 2 April 1969) was a German general in the Wehrmacht of Nazi Germany during World War II. He was a recipient of the Knight's Cross of the Iron Cross.

Awards and decorations

 German Cross in Gold on 21 February 1942 as Major in the II./Infanterie-Regiment 82
 Knight's Cross of the Iron Cross on 30 December 1943 as Oberst and commander of Grenadier-Regiment 166

References

Citations

Bibliography

 
 

1905 births
1969 deaths
People from Bismark, Germany
People from the Province of Saxony
Major generals of the German Army (Wehrmacht)
German prisoners of war in World War II held by the United States
Recipients of the Gold German Cross
Recipients of the Knight's Cross of the Iron Cross
Military personnel from Saxony-Anhalt